K67 is a kiosk design created in 1966 by the Slovenian architect and designer Saša J. Mächtig.

Design 

The design is based on polyfibre reinforced modules, which can be used as single units or combined to large agglomerations. It can serve many different functions; throughout its history it has been used for newspaper kiosks, parking-attendant booths, copyshops, market stands, shelter booths, chip stalls, student cafes, and lottery stands. It appears in different colour combinations (red is the most common), and it is easily visible and accessible. The modular design of the units enables the K67 to fit almost any location.

History 

Patented in 1967, K67 was prepared for serial production in 1968 with the first exhibition of prototypes in Ljutomer, Slovenia. It was manufactured by the Imgrad factory in Ljutomer.

Gallery

References

External links
 K67 The Kiosk Shots Project
The story of the 1960s mass produced modular design that actually went into production 
Design-Ikone: Der universal kompatible Kiosk K67 bekommt ein Update 
K67 Berlin 

Kiosks
Architecture in Slovenia
Slovenian design